Michael Louis Vespoli (born December 14, 1946) is a former American rower and rowing coach. He is the founder and chief executive officer of Vespoli USA, Inc., a boat manufacturer in New Haven, Connecticut, that makes shells for rowing teams and individual rowers. Vespoli was born in New Haven, Connecticut.

Career

His career in rowing started in 1964 when he joined the Georgetown University crew as a walk-on. He went on to row with teams that won several national championships, placed in the 1972 Munich Olympics, and in 1974, was part of a team of eight American rowers that won a World Championship in Switzerland.  He later coached universities and was a sculling coach for the 1980 Olympics in Moscow, which the U.S. boycotted.

As boat technology developed rapidly in England with the advent of carbon fiber and other materials used by the aerospace industry, Vespoli started his company with the help of his retired machinist father in 1980 in the U.S. His wife Nancy Vespoli, who was on the women's crew at Dartmouth College, a member of the 1980 U.S. Olympic rowing crew and has a master's degree in chemical engineering from M.I.T., is also involved in the business. The company has become a well-known boat maker with models that have won many elite races.

Coaching career
 1968 to 1972, Saint Joseph's Preparatory School
 1972 to 1974, University of Massachusetts Amherst
 1974 to 1977, Wichita State University
 1977 to 1980, Yale University

St. Joseph Prep School
National Schoolboy Champions

University of Massachusetts
Two consecutive Dad Vail Men's 8 Champions

Wichita State University
Vespoli was given the goal to develop a nationally recognized rowing program in three years.
 1976, Novice Men's 8, Wichita State defeats Yale.
 1977, Novice HW Men's 8, Wichita State loses to University of Wisconsin by 2.57 seconds

Yale University
 1979, Freshmen HW Men's 8 places first at the Eastern Sprints.

The Tony Johnson-Mike Vespoli coaching combination proves to be formidable. 1979, Yale sweeps in in HW Men's V and JV the Eastern Sprints. Yale's Heavyweight Men's 8 places first again at the 1981 Eastern Sprints. In the four years (1981–1984) following Mike Vespoli's departure as Yale's Frosh Men's Heavyweight coach, Yale's Varsity Men's Heavyweight Crew defeated Harvard in the annual Harvard-Yale race. Yale had not defeated Harvard in 18 years.

From an interview with Rowing News' Jeff Moag, November 2009, Mike Vespoli said, "We won the Eastern Sprints, we beat Harvard, I made enemies with Harry Parker. I think my proudest coaching moment is that when I left Yale and my three classes of freshmen filled the sophomore, junior, and senior years at Yale, those were classes that didn’t lose to Harvard."

U.S. National Team
 1979, Head Coach, U.S. Lightweight Men; Sılver Medal
 1980, Assistant Coach, U.S. Heavyweight Men Scullıng Coach. Dıd not compete due to US boycott.

Mike Vespoli's career has been closely associated with Coach Tony Johnson. Johnson coached Vespoli at Georgetown from 1967 to 1969. Johnson was the assistant coach and Vespoli an oarsman on the 1972 U.S. Olympic Crew. Johnson recommended Vespoli for the Wichita State University position, and Johnson hired Vespoli as Yale's Frosh Men's Coach in 1977. Vespoli is Committee Co-Chair of the Georgetown University Boathouse project where Johnson has coached since 1989.

Vespoli is a former member of the U.S. Olympic Committee for Men's Rowing, a consultant to the President's Commission on Olympic Sports and was an NBC commentator for rowing in Barcelona in 1992.

A member of both the National Rowing Foundation Hall of Fame and the Georgetown Athletic Hall of Fame, Mike has maintained a strong connection to the Georgetown crew program that launched his professionally and personally rewarding career. He served as the chair of the rowing association's board of directors for 16 years and has been a member of the board of regents for another 16. In 2000, Georgetown honored Mike with the Outstanding Service to Athletics award. Mike and his wife, Nancy, are members of the Georgetown 1789 Society.

Mike and Nancy Vespoli established the Vespoli Family Crew Scholarship at Georgetown University in 2003.  The scholarship provides financial aid to one or more intercollegiate rowers who demonstrate financial need. The Vespolis have also donated money in support of the Georgetown University Boathouse project. In April 2006, Nancy Vespoli donated a shell to the Dartmouth College Women's Crew. The crew christened the new shell, the "Fast Eddie." The shell was named after Nancy's father, Eddie Parssinen.

In 2000, Vespoli was honored with the "Power Ten" award. The award is given to those who are committed to supporting the sport of rowing, both nationally and internationally.

References

External links
 Interview on May 28, 2009
 

1946 births
Living people
American male rowers
Georgetown Hoyas rowers
UMass Minutemen and Minutewomen rowing coaches
Wichita State Shockers rowing coaches
Yale Bulldogs rowing coaches
World Rowing Championships medalists for the United States
Pan American Games medalists in rowing
Pan American Games gold medalists for the United States
Congressional Gold Medal recipients
Olympic rowers of the United States
Rowers at the 1972 Summer Olympics
Rowers at the 1975 Pan American Games